Elof Axel Carlson (born 1931) is distinguished teaching professor emeritus at State University of New York at Stony Brook, as well as an American geneticist and noted historian of science. Carlson earned his B.A. in 1953 from New York University, and his PhD in 1958 in zoology from Indiana University Bloomington under the mentorship of Hermann Joseph Muller. Carlson is a past recipient of the E. Harris Harbison Award for excellence in teaching given by the Danforth Foundation.

He has been a visiting professor at the University of Minnesota, San Diego State University, and Tougaloo College. 
He was also a McMurrin Visiting Professor at the University of Utah.

Bibliography
The Gene: a Critical History (1989) 
Genes, Radiation, and Society. The Life and Work of H. J. Muller (Cornell Univ. Press, 1981)
The Unfit: A history of a bad idea (2001) 
Mendel's Legacy: The origin of classical genetics (2004) 
Times of Triumph, Times of Doubt: Science And the Battle for Public Trust (2006)  	
 Neither Gods Nor Beasts: How Science is changing who we think we are (2008) 
 Mutation: The History of an Idea from Darwin to Genomics (2011) 
The 7 Sexes: Biology of Sex Determination (2013)  (cl : alk. paper);  (eb)

Scholarly works co-written
Demerec, M., Kaufmann, B. P., & Carlson, E. A. (1986). Drosophila guide: introduction to the genetics and cytology of Drosophila melanogaster. Washington, D.C.: Carnegie Institute of Washington.

References

1931 births
Living people
New York University alumni
Indiana University Bloomington alumni
University of Utah faculty
American geneticists
American science writers
Stony Brook University faculty